Courting is a British electronic rock band based in Liverpool. The band is composed of Sean Murphy-O'Neill, Sean Thomas, Joshua Cope, and Connor McCann.

Background 
The band formed in 2018 in Liverpool. In 2022, the band released their debut album Guitar Music which was met with critical acclaim.

Style and influences 
The band has been described as a clash of post-punk and hyperpop. The band has also been described as indie rock, and art punk.

The band has cited Saint Etienne, Yard Act, Half Man Half Biscuit, The Lounge Society, Black Country, New Road, Jockstrap, Lazarus Kane, PVA, Blanketman, Do Nothing, Buzzard x3, Sprints, Malady, Hallan, Panic Shack, Loose Articles, TV Priest, Talk Show, Legss, Ethan P. Flynn, and Duran Duran as influences.

Discography

Studio albums 
 Guitar Music (2022)

Extended plays 
 Grand National (2021)

Singles

Other appearances

References

External links 
 Official Website

English rock music groups
PIAS Recordings artists
Musical groups established in 2018
Musical quartets
Musical groups from Liverpool
2018 establishments in the United Kingdom
Hyperpop musicians